Crocosmia masoniorum, called the giant montbretia, is a species of flowering plant in the genus Crocosmia, native to South Africa. It has gained the Royal Horticultural Society's Award of Garden Merit.

References

Iridaceae
Endemic flora of South Africa
Plants described in 1932 
Taxa named by Louisa Bolus
Taxa named by N. E. Brown